Petrovice is a municipality and village in Hradec Králové District in the Hradec Králové Region of the Czech Republic. It has about 300 inhabitants.

Administrative parts
The village of Kanice is an administrative part of Petrovice.

References

Villages in Hradec Králové District